Amâncio d'Alpoim Miranda "Pancho" Guedes (Lisbon, Portugal, 13 May 1925 – Graaff-Reinet, South Africa, 7 November 2015) was a Portuguese architect, sculptor and painter an educator.

He is described as one of the earliest post-modernist architects in Africa and an archetype Eclectic Modernist.

Early life 
Guedes was born in Lisbon, Portugal in 1925. He is a descendant of Portuguese nobleman Luis de Alpoim.

Guedes spent much of his life in Portuguese Mozambique from the age of 7 years old and he would stay there for most of his life.

Wanting to become an artist, he enrolled at the University of Witwatersrand in Johannesburg in 1945. He soon decided to study architecture which was to him the culmination and combination of all the artistic trades that interested him.

Architecture career 
Guedes then began his career and produced a multitude of projects in the 1950s and 60s as building activity intensified in Mozambique.

In East Africa he produced the designs for hundreds of buildings, many of them in the city of Lourenço Marques (Maputo) but also in Angola, in South Africa, and in Portugal. His creations mixed the sculptural and figurative with practical requirements and traditional local identity.

Guedes was part of  “Team 10”, a group of architects who assembled in July 1953 at the 9th Congress of CIAM and adopted a new approach to urbanism through impactful theoretical frameworks which influenced the development of European architectural thought during the late 20th century.

Arguably, one of Guedes' most famous buildings is the Smiling Lion Building from 1956 built in Mozambique. Guedes calls the style of this building STILOGUEDES which translates loosely as 'GuedesStyle'. The high level mural on the West façade is still intact and so is the "smiling lion" on the North corner. The lion is a small concrete casting with a smile hence the name of the building.

Artistic career 
Aside from his large-scale architectural projects, he was also a sculptor and painter.

Exhibitions of his visual art have taken place at the Berardo Collection Museum in Lisbon, among other venues.

Guedes bought works by Paul Klee in 1948, admiring his surrealist style and infantile themes. He made sculptures inspired by Paul Klee's Angels at the end of his career. One of his last sketches, made in 2015, was entitled 'A Tribute to Paul Klee'.

Political problems 
After the events of the Carnation Revolution in Lisbon, he left newly independent Mozambique in 1974. Mozambique was officially established in 1975 as the People's Republic of Mozambique.

His rapid departure from Mozambique in 1974 along with other Portuguese subject to the 24/20 declaration (giving them 24 hours to leave and allowing them to take 20 kilograms of belongings) left his family almost penniless. Due to his reputation, he received an invitation to take the vacant chair of Architecture at the University of the Witwatersrand in Johannesburg.

Death 
Pancho Guedes died on 7 November 2015 at the age of 90.

Works
Church in Maputo (1962)

References

External links

Official site

20th-century Portuguese architects
Portuguese sculptors
Male sculptors
Portuguese painters
Portuguese male painters
1925 births
2015 deaths
People from Maputo
Portuguese expatriates in Mozambique
Academic staff of the University of the Witwatersrand
People from Lisbon